Albert Samuel Gallin, better known as Sandy Gallin, (May 27, 1940 – April 21, 2017) was an American producer and talent manager, winner of an Emmy Award.

Early life and education
Gallin was born on May 27, 1940 in New York, the son of middle class Jewish parents.  
Gallin graduated from Boston University in 1962.

Career 
Gallin joined the mailroom of General Artists Corporation and eventually became a senior vice president and board member.  After less than a year at GAC, he became a junior agent. During this time he played a role in booking The Beatles on The Ed Sullivan Show.

In 1970 he left GAC and partnered with his cousin, Raymond Katz, to create the personal management company Katz Gallin, which lasted 14 years. One of his early clients was country music crossover artist Mac Davis, who introduced him to Dolly Parton. He served as her personal manager for the next 25 years, and also went on to manage the careers of Cher, Michael Jackson, Neil Diamond, Barbra Streisand, Mariah Carey, and Whoopi Goldberg.

Gallin produced over 20 movies as well as Broadway plays, with Dolly Parton was co-owner of the film and television production company Sandollar Productions, and was the CEO of Mirage Entertainment and Sports. He was a close associate of Steve Wynn, Barry Diller, David Geffen, Diane Von Furstenberg, and Calvin Klein.

His 70th birthday party was thrown at Donna Karan's West Village studio and was attended by Patti LaBelle, Barbra Streisand, Joan Rivers, Bette Midler, Vera Wang, Renée Zellweger, Richard Gere, Sandra Bernhard, Les Moonves, and Ron Perelman.

Sexual harassment issues

In 1997, Gallin was sued by two former employees alleging sexual harassment. The lawsuit alleged Gallin asked them to coordinate sexual visits with men, as well as to offer their sexual services to potential clients to secure relationships. Gallin responded with a countersuit alleging his former employees had breached their contractual obligations with his firm and produced the sexual harassment allegations by way of distraction from their violations.

Personal life 
Gallin was openly gay. In February 2014, he married his boyfriend of five years and his junior by over 30 years, actor Bryan Fox. They filed for divorce in August 2015.

Gallin was first diagnosed with cancer in 1988. On April 21, 2017, Gallin died following a long battle with multiple myeloma. He was 76.

References

1940 births
2017 deaths
Deaths from multiple myeloma
American television producers
American film producers
20th-century American Jews
Gay Jews
Talent managers
LGBT people from New York (state)
LGBT television producers
Deaths from cancer in California
21st-century American Jews